A pre-lit tree is a convergent product of Christmas lights and an artificial Christmas tree. The product is an artificial fir tree that comes pre-wired and strung with lights, which cannot be removed and are usually embedded within the artificial branches.  The product can be sold as a kit - the user assembles the tree and plugs it into an electrical outlet - or the dealer may assemble it before the sale.  Pre-lit trees may have traditional mini bulb lights, LED lights, or fiber-optic lights. Larger trees usually contain traditional strands of bulb lights while smaller tabletop trees have fiber optic branches. Some more expensive trees come with energy-efficient LED lights. Pre-lit trees are being classified into the categories of electrical products.

History

The first lighted Christmas trees made use of candles.  Attaching the candles was a difficult process, and proved to be a fire hazard. The tree could not be left unattended when the candles were lit. A bucket of water also had to be kept near the tree and someone had to keep watch for a possible fire. Candle wax was expensive, so later trees used lamps that were made from nutshell halves filled with oil and a wick. More elegant lamps were made from different colours of glass. The new candle holder, called a counterbalance candle holder, had a weight attached to the bottom that kept the candle standing upright. However, even with these improvements, the trees still proved to be fire hazards.

The invention of the electric light added a new dimension to Christmas trees. In 1882 an inventor named Edward Hibberd Johnson working for Thomas Edison devised a way of wrapping small electric lights in red, white, and blue crêpe paper. These coloured lights that were strung on a tree provided the earliest version of contemporary Christmas lights. However, Christmas tree lights were still experimental throughout the 1880s.

Miniature Christmas lights were first developed in 1895 by Ralph E. Morris, an employee of the New England Telephone Company. Morris’ idea for miniature Christmas lights occurred as he was looking at the tiny bulbs on telephone switchboards. However, many Americans still distrusted the safety of electric lights throughout the early 1900s and candles were still used to illuminate trees. The early Christmas tree lights were simply night-lights strung together to form light strings. When General Electric commercially introduced Christmas lights, they quickly became popular. Edison Electric soon followed suit with an electric Christmas lamp.

In the early 1990s the world's largest artificial Christmas tree maker, Boto Company (bankrupted in January 2008) started the first production of pre-lit trees supplied to Target stores.  Recent technical advances in the manufacturing process of pre-lit trees has made them easy to assemble and realistic looking.

Safety issues

Shock and fire hazards
The U.S. Consumer Product Safety Commission (CPSC) is urging people to look for and eliminate potential dangers from holiday lights and decorations that could lead to fires and injuries. Each year, hospital emergency rooms treat about 1,300 people for injuries related to holiday lights and 6,200 people for injuries related to holiday decorations and Christmas trees. In addition, Christmas trees are involved in about 400 fires in the U.S. annually, resulting in 10 deaths, 80 injuries and an average of more than $15 million in property loss and damage each year.  Most of those fire accidents were caused by real Christmas trees. With artificial trees, the risk of fire is lowered with new fire-resistant plastics. However, pre-lit trees do pose a higher fire hazard compared to artificial Christmas trees and there have been recalls in the past to safeguard the safety of consumers. The following are some of the major recalls:

U.S. Consumer Product Safety Commission announced recalls by Target on 7' Artificial Pine Christmas Trees and accompanying extension cords in 1993 due to fire risk from the extension cords supplied with the lighted trees, which may overheat or melt.
Walgreens, of Deerfield, Ill., voluntarily recalled about 9,000 artificial Christmas trees with fiber optic lights in 2000. A colour wheel in the tree stand that is used to light the tree can overheat and catch fire.
In 2007 the U.S. Consumer Product Safety Commission ordered a recall of Prelit Palm Trees imported by iObjectSolutions Inc. for hazards of overheating and electrical shocks. If the electrical connectors were not fully inserted, they could overheat and pose electrical shocks and fire hazards.

Toxic substances
For pre-lit trees, the real threat of toxic substances are mainly the lead (Pb), mercury (Hg), cadmium (Cd) and chromium (Cr) associated with the lights attached on the trees.

Safety standards
All pre-lit trees are being classified into electrical products. They are subject to the laws and safety standards for electrical products such as UL in the United States, CSA in Canada, AS/NZS in Australia and New Zealand, GS
in Germany, BS in the United Kingdom, and RoHS in the European Union.

Storage
Along with the safety issues, another issue for considering using pre-lit trees is storage considerations. Because the lights on a pre-lit Christmas tree are tied together it will be important to use the right method of storage for this type of tree. There are different options that Christmas tree companies offer for pre-lit Christmas tree storage.  Many of these allow for the user to store the tree in a box while others offer bags for storage. It is also important to consider the height of the tree for storage.  Using the box that the Christmas tree came in is by far the most common option that is used for handling a Christmas tree. This is because the box will be perfectly built to where it will be easier to move the tree around and to keep it properly secured. In many cases oversized boxes will be used for storage primarily so that the tree will be able to be stored properly during shipping.

Many companies offer bags to be used for handling pre-lit trees. The bag can be strapped along a pre-lit tree.  The tree branches are pulled upwards and the bag is placed under the tree. Using its handles, the bag is then pulled up over the tree, and the bag can be stored by hanging it from the handles.

References

External links
 U.S. Consumer Product Safety Commission 

Artificial Christmas trees